The West Palm Beach Sheriffs were a minor league baseball team, based in West Palm Beach, Florida, as a member of the early Florida State League in 1928. They were the first team to represent West Palm Beach inside of Florida State League. The city would not host another FSL team until the West Palm Beach Indians arrived in 1940. The team folded in 1928, when the FSL went on a hiatus.

References
Baseball Reference

Baseball teams established in 1928
Defunct Florida State League teams
Sports in Palm Beach County, Florida
Defunct baseball teams in Florida
1928 establishments in Florida
1928 disestablishments in Florida
Baseball teams disestablished in 1928